The Health Workers' Union of Ukraine (Medprof) is a trade union representing workers in the healthcare sector in Ukraine.

The union was established in 1990, as the successor of the Ukrainian council of the Trade Union of Medical Workers.  It affiliated to the Federation of Trade Unions of Ukraine.  At the start of 2011, it had 1,128,525 members, but by 2019, its membership had fallen to 747,000.

References

External links

Healthcare trade unions
Trade unions established in 1990
Trade unions in Ukraine